Sar Tappeh is a village in Daland Rural District, in the Central District of Ramian County, Golestan Province, Iran. At the 2006 census, its population was 254, in 61 families.

References 

Populated places in Ramian County